Derek Mazou-Sacko (born 6 October 2004) is a French professional footballer who plays as a midfielder for Ligue 1 club Troyes.

Club career 
On 18 December 2021, Mazou-Sacko made his professional debut for Troyes in a Coupe de France match against Nancy. The match ended in a 4–2 penalty shoot-out victory for Nancy after a 1–1 draw.

International career 
Born in France, Mazou-Sacko is of Ivorian descent. He is a France youth international, and has represented his country at under-18 level.

References 

2004 births
Living people
People from Sarcelles
Footballers from Val-d'Oise
French footballers
France youth international footballers
French sportspeople of Ivorian descent
Association football midfielders
ES Troyes AC players
Ligue 1 players
Championnat National 3 players